Nimshew is a former mining town in Butte County, California, formed to house workers at the nearby Nimshew gold mine. It lies at an elevation of 2507 feet (764 m). It had a post office from 1880 to 1923. It is now a neighborhood of Magalia.

References

Unincorporated communities in Butte County, California